Xanadu is the soundtrack to the 1980 musical film of the same name, featuring the Australian singer Olivia Newton-John and the British group Electric Light Orchestra (ELO). It was released in June 1980 on MCA Records in the United States and July 1980 by Jet Records in the United Kingdom. The original LP release featured on side one the songs of Newton-John, and on side two the songs of ELO. In 2008 the soundtrack album was digitally remastered as a bonus CD as part of the film's DVD release titled Xanadu: Magical Musical Edition.

Although the film was a critical and commercial disappointment, the soundtrack was a worldwide success and received positive reviews from music critics, earning double platinum certifications in the United States and Canada. The singles "Magic" and "Xanadu" reached number one in the United States and United Kingdom, respectively. It was the fifth most popular US soundtrack of 1981.

Background 
The soundtrack featured songs on side one by the film's star, Olivia Newton-John, written by her long-time producer, John Farrar. The songs on side two were written and performed by ELO; the title track which closed side two featured Newton-John as lead vocalist.

The Newton-John side also featured Cliff Richard, the Tubes and Gene Kelly.

At the time of the album's release, Olivia Newton-John was signed to MCA Records, while ELO were signed to Jet Records.  A compromise was worked out between the two companies in that the album was released on MCA in the US and Canada, and on Jet in the rest of the world.

Track listing 
All tracks on Side One written by John Farrar.

All tracks on Side Two written by Jeff Lynne.

Personnel

Side One: Olivia Newton-John 

 Olivia Newton-John – lead vocals, backing vocals
 John Farrar – electric guitars, synthesizers, backing vocals
 David Hungate – bass guitar on "Magic" and "Suspended in Time"
 David McDaniel – bass guitar on "Suddenly"
 Ed Greene – drums, percussion (except on "Magic")
 Carlos Vega – drums, percussion on "Magic"
 Jai Winding – electric piano on "Suddenly"
 Michael Boddicker – vocoder on "Suddenly"

Additional personnel
 Cliff Richard – co-lead vocals on "Suddenly"
 Fee Waybill – co-lead vocals on "Dancin'"
 Roger Steen – guitars on "Dancin'"
 Bill Spooner – guitars on "Dancin'"
 Michael Cotten – synthesizer on "Dancin'"
 Gene Kelly – co-lead vocals on "Whenever You're Away from Me"
 Lou Halmy – whistling on "Whenever You're Away from Me"
 Strings arranged and conducted by Richard Hewson
 David J. Holman – engineer and mixer
 Recorded and mixed at David J. Holman Studio in Laurel Canyon

Side Two: Electric Light Orchestra

 Jeff Lynne – lead vocals (except on "Xanadu"), backing vocals, electric guitars, acoustic guitars, keyboards, synthesizers
 Bev Bevan – drums, percussion, tympani
 Richard Tandy – pianos, synthesizers, keyboards
 Kelly Groucutt – bass guitar, backing vocals

Additional personnel
 Olivia Newton-John – lead vocals on "Xanadu"
 James Newton-Howard - synthesizers on "Xanadu" 
 Strings by Louis Clark
 Mack – engineer

Charts

Weekly charts

Year-end charts

Certifications and sales

References 

1980 soundtrack albums
Albums produced by Jeff Lynne
Albums produced by John Farrar
Electric Light Orchestra albums
Fantasy film soundtracks
Jet Records soundtracks
MCA Records soundtracks
Musical film soundtracks
Olivia Newton-John soundtracks
Romance film soundtracks
Split albums